King of Hearts is a posthumous album of Roy Orbison songs put together from master sessions and demos by Jeff Lynne for Virgin Records, and Orbison's 23rd album overall. According to the authorized Roy Orbison biography, the collection was originally released in October 1992 on CD, music cassette, and LP.

History 
Roy Orbison died on December 6, 1988, aged 52, from a heart attack in the middle of his career revival. After Orbison's death, Mystery Girl was released. Several songs had been recorded during the sessions, and there was enough material for a new album. Some songs on this album were recorded as demos. Several individuals produced the recordings, including Lynne. They were: Don Was, David Was, Pete Anderson, Robbie Robertson, Will Jennings, David Briggs, Chips Moman, Guy Roche, Albert Hammond and Diane Warren.

Several songs had been previously released.  
"Wild Hearts Run Out Of Time" was from the soundtrack of the 1985 film Insignificance, and under the title "Wild Hearts (...Time)" had been issued as a single in Canada, Australia and Europe that same year.  
"Coming Home" was initially issued on the 1986 collaborative album Class of '55: Memphis Rock & Roll Homecoming, which also featured Jerry Lee Lewis, Johnny Cash and Carl Perkins.  It was Orbison's only solo lead vocal on that album.
A duet with k.d. lang of Orbison's 1961 hit single "Crying" was released as part of the soundtrack for the 1987 motion picture Hiding Out. The collaboration won the Grammy Award for Best Country Collaboration with Vocals. The duet "Crying" was a minor US chart hit for the pair, peaking at No. 42 on the hot country singles chart, but a more substantial hit in the UK in 1992, reaching No. 13 on the UK Singles Chart.

"I Drove All Night" was another hit single from the album.

Clarence Clemons performed saxophone on "We'll Take the Night".

Track listing

Certifications

Notes 

Roy Orbison albums
1992 albums
Albums published posthumously
Albums produced by Jeff Lynne
Virgin Records albums